Patricia McKenzie (born 1987) is a Canadian actress, producer, dancer and singer.

Career
Patricia is best known as an actress for her role in Cosmopolis and on television as Reena in Charlie Jade and Jenn in Naked Josh.

On stage, McKenzie has performed in numerous musicals, including The Lion King, the French production of Chicago, and Notre-Dame de Paris.

Her film and television roles include Gangland Undercover, Sigma, Stardom, Soul Food, Blue Murder, Bliss, Bob Gratton: Ma Vie, Student Bodies, Flowers Don't Last, The Take-Away Bride, Tout sur moi and Cosmopolis.

Filmography

 TSN Caribbean Workout (1998)
 No Alibi (2000)
 Student Bodies (2000)
 La vie après l'amour (2000)
 Stardom (2000)
 Soul Food (2002)
 Blue Murder (2003)
 Bliss (2004)
 Naked Josh (2004–2006)
 Sigma (2005)
 The Take-Away Bride (2005)
 Charlie Jade (2005)
 Flowers Don't Last (2006)
 Bob Gratton, ma vie/My Life (2007)
 Les Sœurs Elliot (2007–2008)
 The Perfect Assistant (2008)
 Tout sur moi (2008)
 The Telephone Eulogies (2008)
 Phantom (2009)
 Die (2010)
 Blue Mountain State (2010)
 Mirador (2011)
 Black Cadillacs (2011)
 The Will (2012)
 Cosmopolis (2012)
 Claddagh (2012–2013)
 Fidelity (2013)
 Still Life: A Three Pines Mystery (2013)
 30 vies (2013–2014)
 Trauma (2014)
 La théorie du K.O. (2014)
 Bully Fighters (2014)
 Gangland Undercover (2015)
 2 femmes à Hollywood (2015)
 Anathema (2016)
 The Kindness of Strangers (2019)

Awards 

Patricia received a 2006 Gemini nomination for Best Supporting Actress in Charlie Jade.

Naked Josh was nominated for a 2006 Monte-Carlo Television Festival Award for Best Comedy Ensemble.

References

External links 
 
 

1987 births
Actresses from Quebec
Black Canadian actresses
Canadian film actresses
Canadian television actresses
Living people
People from Gaspésie–Îles-de-la-Madeleine
Anglophone Quebec people